Several ships in the United States Navy have been named USS Monocacy for the Battle of Monocacy:

 , a gunboat launched in 1864, and served until 1903
 , commissioned in 1914 and decommissioned in 1939
 , originally the civilian tug Monocacy (1905)

United States Navy ship names